São Brás is a landlocked civil parish in the municipality of Praia da Vitória on the Portuguese island of Terceira in the Azores. The population in 2011 was 1,088, in an area of 4.68 km². It contains the localities Baldio, Canada da Quinta, Canada das Covas, Cruz, Fundões, Ladeira do Cardosa, Lourais, Quatro Canadas and São Brás.

References

Freguesias of Praia da Vitória